Oscar Gustavo Cárdenas Monroy (born 4 March 1954) is a Mexican politician affiliated with the Institutional Revolutionary Party. He served as Deputy of the LVI and LX Legislatures of the Mexican Congress representing the State of Mexico. He also served in the XLIX and LV Legislatures of the Congress of the State of Mexico, as well as the municipal president of Jocotitlán.

References

1954 births
Living people
Politicians from the State of Mexico
Institutional Revolutionary Party politicians
21st-century Mexican politicians
Deputies of the LX Legislature of Mexico
Members of the Chamber of Deputies (Mexico) for the State of Mexico
20th-century Mexican politicians
Members of the Congress of the State of Mexico
Municipal presidents in the State of Mexico